The Big Door Prize is an upcoming comedy television series based on the book of the same name by M.O. Walsh that is set to premiere on Apple TV+ on March 29, 2023.

Premise
A machine appears in the grocery store of a small town that is able to predict the destinies of those who observe it.

Cast
 Chris O'Dowd as Dusty
 Gabrielle Dennis as Cass
 Damon Gupton as Father Reuben
 Josh Segarra as Giorgio
 Christian Adam as Trevor
 Sammy Fourlas as Jacob
 Djouliet Amara as Trina
 Ally Maki as Hana
 Crystal R. Fox as Izzy
 Jim Meskimen

Episodes
Anu Valia, Molly McGlynn, Todd Biermann, Jenée LaMarque and Declan Lowney will direct episodes of the series.

Production
It was announced in May 2021 that Apple TV+ had greenlit a ten-episode series based on the book, with David West Read set to serve as showrunner. In December, Chris O'Dowd was cast to star, with Gabrielle Dennis, Damon Gupton, Josh Segarra and Sammy Forulas also added to the cast. In February 2022, Djouliet Amara, Ally Maki and Crystal R. Fox joined the cast.

Principal photography for season one took place in December 2021 in Georgia.  Filming for season two began January 23 and is expected to end on May 2, 2023 in Atlanta, Georgia.

References

External links
The Big Door Prize on Apple TV+

Apple TV+ original programming
Upcoming comedy television series
American comedy television series
English-language television shows
Television series by CJ E&M
Television series by Studio Dragon
Television series by Skydance Television
Television shows filmed in Georgia (U.S. state)
Television shows based on books